The discography of American soul and gospel singer Candi Staton consists of 28 studio albums and over 30 singles.

Studio albums

Singles

Notes

References

Pop music discographies
Discographies of American artists